The tenth series of the Australian cooking game show MasterChef Australia premiered on 7 May 2018 on Network Ten. Judges Gary Mehigan, George Calombaris and Matt Preston returned from the previous series, with Shannon Bennett as the contestants' mentor.

This series was won by Sashi Cheliah in the grand finale against Ben Borsht, on 31 July 2018.

Changes
This season introduced a change in the Mystery Box Challenge. The winner will be going straight into the Immunity Challenge, which means he/she will not be cooking in the invention test and will be safe from the Pressure Test on the following day.

Week 10 featured the remaining contestants competing for a special "10-Year Superpower" apron, which works similar to an immunity pin and a Power Apron but allows the bearer to withdraw during any stage of any individual challenge up to tasting.

Contestants

Top 24
The Top 24 were announced on 7–8 May 2018. Contestant Jo Kendray was a returning auditionee after two previous attempts to make it into the Top 24

Future appearances

 Khanh Ong, Jess Liemantara, Reece Hignell, Brendan Pang and Sarah Clare appeared on Series 12. Sarah was eliminated on May 19, 2020, finishing 14th. Jess was eliminated on May 31, 2020, finishing 12th. Khanh was eliminated on June 14, 2020, finishing 9th. Brendan was eliminated on June 21, 2020, finishing 8th and Reece was eliminated on July 12, 2020, finishing 5th.
 In Series 14 Aldo Ortado appeared for another chance to win the title, along with Sashi Cheliah who is competing to win the title for the second time. Sashi was eliminated on May 15, 2022, finishing 19th and Aldo was eliminated on June 26, 2022, finishing 8th.

Guest chefs

Elimination chart

Episodes and ratings
 Colour key:
  – Highest rating during the series
  – Lowest rating during the series

References

External links
 Official Website

MasterChef Australia
2018 Australian television seasons
2018 in Australian television